Costanzo Celestini (born May 14, 1961) is an Italian football coach and a former player, who played as a midfielder. He is the head coach of Sestri Levante.

Playing career 
Celestini played a part in Napoli's initial glory days, being a regular in the initial parts of the 1980s, but he was being reduced to a bit-part player when Napoli won the 1986-87 league title, leaving the club for Ascoli shortly afterwards.

After Napoli, Celestini failed to recapture his form, soon being reduced to a Serie B player in Avellino. He ended his career in 1995 at Juve Stabia.

Coaching career 
In June 2018, he was appointed head coach of Sestri Levante in Serie D.

References

External links 
 

1961 births
People from Capri, Campania
Footballers from Campania
Living people
Ascoli Calcio 1898 F.C. players
Italian footballers
U.S. Catanzaro 1929 players
Pisa S.C. players
S.S. Juve Stabia players
S.S.C. Napoli players
U.S. Avellino 1912 players
Serie A players
Serie B players
Association football midfielders
Italian football managers